Carapichea is a genus of flowering plants in the family Rubiaceae. It is native to Central America and northern South America from Nicaragua to Brazil. One species, Carapichea ipecacuanha, is used medicinally as the source of ipecac, a powerful emetic.

Species include:
Carapichea adinantha
Carapichea affinis (Standl.) L.Andersson - Costa Rica, Bolivia, Colombia, Ecuador, Peru, Brazil 
Carapichea altsonii
Carapichea araguariensis
Carapichea crebinervia
Carapichea dolichophylla (Standl.) C.M.Taylor - Colombia, Ecuador, Peru
Carapichea fimbriflora
Carapichea franquevilleana
Carapichea guianensis Aubl. - Suriname, French Guiana, Amapá, Pará
Carapichea ipecacuanha (Brot.) L.Andersson - Costa Rica, Nicaragua, Panama, Colombia, Brazil
Carapichea klugii
Carapichea ligularis (Rudge) Delprete - Brazil, Suriname, French Guiana, Guyana
Carapichea lucida J.G.Jardim & Zappi - Bahia
Carapichea maturacensis
Carapichea necopinata
Carapichea nivea
Carapichea pacimonica
Carapichea panurensis
Carapichea sandwithiana
Carapichea tillettii
Carapichea urniformis
Carapichea vasivensis
Carapichea verrucosa

References

External links 
 Kew World Checklist of Selected Plant Families, Carapichea

Rubiaceae genera
Palicoureeae